New York Road Runners (NYRR) is a non-profit running organization based in New York City whose mission is to help and inspire people through running. It was founded in 1958 by Ted Corbitt with 47 members and has since grown to a membership of more than 60,000.  As of 2012, it was considered to be the premier running organization in the United States.

History
Following his establishment of the Road Runners Club of America in 1958, Ted Corbitt became the founding president of New York Road Runners later that year. Fred Lebow, co-founder of the New York City Marathon, served as president from 1972 to 1994. Under Lebow, other signature races, including the Mini 10K, 5th Avenue Mile, and Midnight Run, were established. Allan Steinfeld succeeded Lebow and was named technical director of the New York City Marathon, which he was credited with modernizing, in 1981.

In 2005, Mary Wittenberg succeeded Steinfeld as president and CEO of NYRR. She also became the first female director of the New York City Marathon.

Michael Capiraso succeeded Wittenberg in 2015.  In 2020 Kerin Hempel succeeded Capiraso, and in 2022  Rob Simmelkjaer  succeeded Hempel and is the current CEO of the organization. George Hirsch is the organization's chair.

From 1981 through 2015, NYRR was headquartered on the Upper East Side on East 89th Street (also known as Fred Lebow Place), not far from Central Park. Upon the sale of that building, they announced a move to and creation of a Run Center near Columbus Circle the following year. Prior to 1981, it was based at the West Side YMCA.

Community
NYRR serves runners of all ages and abilities annually through races, community open runs, walks, training, virtual products, and other running-related programming. Our free youth programs and events serve kids in New York City's five boroughs and across the country.

Abebe Bikila Award
The club gives out the Abebe Bikila Award annually in recognition of individuals who have contributed to the sport of running. First awarded in 1978 and named in honor of Olympic marathon winner Abebe Bikila, the award is presented annually in November.

Races
Races are held nearly every weekend and includes destination races such as the:
 TCS New York City Marathon
 United Airlines NYC Half
 RBC Brooklyn Half
 Mastercard New York Mini 10K 
 New Balance 5th Avenue Mile

References

External links
 Official Site

Road running in the United States
Running clubs in the United States
Sports in New York (state)
1958 establishments in New York City